Leendert van Oosten (7 November 1884 – 6 July 1936) was a Dutch wrestler. He competed in the men's Greco-Roman light heavyweight at the 1908 Summer Olympics.

References

1884 births
1936 deaths
Dutch male sport wrestlers
Olympic wrestlers of the Netherlands
Wrestlers at the 1908 Summer Olympics
Sportspeople from Rotterdam